Balipu is a town of Lintao County, Dingxi, Gansu, China. Its name is based on the location being eight li (distance unit)  from the county seat of Lintao, Taoyang.

References 

Lintao County
Township-level divisions of Gansu